X-Men ReLoad was the name given by Marvel Comics to their May 2004 revamp of the X-Men titles with new looks for the characters and fresh plot points. The revamp was prompted by Grant Morrison's departure from New X-Men.

As a result of the revamp, Chris Claremont moved from writing X-Treme X-Men to writing Uncanny X-Men, with Alan Davis doing the art. Chuck Austen moved from writing Uncanny X-Men to New X-Men, which returned to its old name of simply X-Men, with Salvador Larroca, who had been working with him on Uncanny X-Men doing the art.  Finally, Joss Whedon entered as the writer of the new title Astonishing X-Men, with John Cassaday as artist.  X-Treme X-Men was cancelled.   Also, the X-Men returned to more traditional (if not slightly revised) costumes, as opposed to the black leather uniforms from the movies.

In addition to this reshuffle of the main titles, many of the secondary X-Men books were given new writers as well.

Publication history
The "post-Morrison" period that was known as the ReLoad event began when Grant Morrison's run for writing New X-Men ended and X-Treme X-Men was canceled. Chris Claremont who was writing X-Treme at that time was then returned to writing Uncanny X-Men, the title that he was famous for penning throughout the majority of the 1970s and 1980s. After Grant Morrison stepped down from writing New X-Men, the title was changed back to simply X-Men and continued with its numbering instead of restarting as issue #1. The three main X-Men team books consisted of the aforementioned X-Men, Astonishing X-Men, and Uncanny X-Men with the three main teams being led by Havok, Cyclops, and Storm respectively. Many individual X-Men characters received their own solo series as part of this event, but few lasted beyond twelve issues and many of the solo titles were cancelled after only a few issues due to poor sales. Astonishing X-Men quickly proved to be the most popular and highest selling X-Men title at that time and received strong reviews from fans and critics alike for its artwork, pacing, and writing. Astonishing X-Men became so popular that it was the only X-book at that time to receive spin-off series like X-Men: Phoenix - Endsong and an origin series for Colossus.

Many then-current titles were changed to fit with the revamp and along with that many titles were also cancelled to make way for new x-books. Some of the titles that were cancelled included volume 2 of New Mutants in order to make room for a new series focused on the newest generation of X-Men students called New X-Men volume 2. X-Treme X-Men was also cancelled and saw Storm bringing her team to work as the X.S.E. under a United Nations charter. X-Statix was cancelled in order to make room for District X, which saw Bishop policing a troubled mutant community in New York City. The series Agent X and Soldier X were both cancelled in order to provide room for the new series Cable & Deadpool. District X, Madrox, and new issues of Wolverine were re-branded as part of the Marvel Knights collection. The status-quo that was established in this event remained for a year until the House of M crossover event in 2005 drastically changed the tone of all X-books by having the majority of the world's mutants de-powered.

Notable changes
Many characters and story arcs entered a brand new direction as part of the ReLoad event. Some of the most notable changes that had the most impact were the X.S.E. moving to the newly rebuilt mansion as their main headquarters, the Danger Room gained self-awareness and became a sentient being, Rogue finally learning her real name, Kitty Pryde returned to the X-Men full-time, Cyclops and Emma Frost became co-headmasters of the school and thus co-leaders of the X-Men, Colossus and Psylocke were both resurrected, Professor X left the X-Men in hopes of rebuilding Genosha alongside Magneto, the appearance of the real Xorn, the introduction of S.W.O.R.D., and X-23 officially joins the X-Men.

Titles involved
Astonishing X-Men: volume 3, #1Cable & Deadpool: volume 1, #1District X: volume 1, #1Excalibur: volume 3, #1Gambit: volume 2, #1Madrox: volume 1, #1Jubilee: volume 1, #1New X-Men: volume 2, #1Nightcrawler: volume 3: #1Rogue: volume 3, #1Uncanny X-Men: volume 1, #444Wolverine: volume 2, #13X-Force: volume 2, #1X-Men: volume 1, #157

References

X-Men titles